Chilla is a wilderness area and part of Rajaji National Park in India. Known as an electricity creator (on the River) area in the Pauri Garhwal district in the Indian state of Uttarakhand. It is also well known as a wild tourist place of Uttarakhand, standing in the middle of Rishikesh and Haridwar, nearby Ganga Bhogpur.

National parks in Uttarakhand
Pauri Garhwal district
Protected areas with year of establishment missing